or Hatakeyama Yoshitsugu was a Japanese daimyō of the Sengoku period, who was the 14th head of the Nihonmatsu clan (a branch of the Hatakeyama clan) of Mutsu.

In 1568, Yoshitsugu was attacked by Date Terumune, the father of the famous Date Masamune, outnumbered and defeated, he pretended to surrender.

In 1585, instead Yoshitsugu took Terumune as a hostage, Masamune’s forces counterattacked, and in the ensuring battle, both Nihonmatsu Yoshitsugu and Date Terumune were killed.

After the death of Date Terumune at Nihonmatsu's hands, his rival Date Masamune swore revenge, which culminated in the Battle of Hitotoribashi.

References

Daimyo
Hatakeyama clan
1552 births
1586 deaths